The USC Helenes, founded in 1921, is one of the University of Southern California's oldest service organization.

Known as the Official Hosts of USC, the Helenes strive to embody the five attributes of the ideal Trojan (faithful, scholarly, skillful, ambitious and courageous—inscribed on the Trojan Shrine) and are prominent within the university and the Los Angeles community for their acts of service. The USC Helenes' vision statement is "Unity, Service, Commitment."

History

In 1921 Arabella De Oliviera established the USC Helenes as an all-female service organization. Originally the Helenes were called the Amazons and membership was reserved for upper classmen. The lower classmen involved were divided into two groups: the Chimes and the Spurs. When the Amazons changed their name in 1969 to the "Helenes," the three separate branches became one, unified organization. The name change was implemented to keep with the Trojan theme of the University and was inspired by the iconic Helen of Troy.

The organization recently celebrated 100 years of service and tradition at USC and continues to be a presence on campus and in the surrounding LA area. After the unveiling of the statue of Hecuba in the USC Village, the Helenes began guarding the statue as part of "rivalry week" activities surrounding the annual game against UCLA.

As of Fall 2016, Erica Lovano McCann serves as the Helenes faculty advisor.

References

External links
USC Helenes homepage

Helenes